Cochylis securifera is a species of moth of the family Tortricidae. It is found in Brazil in the states of Espírito Santo and Paraná.

References

Moths described in 1983
Cochylis